The 2000 BFGoodrich Tires Trans-Am Series was the 35th season of the Sports Car Club of America's Trans-Am Series. 2000 marked the end of the "American muscle revival" era that had begun in 1989, with Italian manufacturer Qvale winning the championship. It would also mark the rise of Rocketsports Racing's dominance using Jaguar XKRs, which would continue until the series dissolved in 2006, after which team owner Paul Gentilozzi would switch to the American Le Mans Series. The season also marked the final victory for Pontiac in Trans Am, with a win at Texas.

Teams and drivers
{|
|

Results

Championship standings

Drivers

References

Trans-Am Series
2000 in American motorsport